TerZake is a TV news magazine published in Belgium. It was founded in 1983 and is published on a quarterly basis.

See also
 List of magazines in Belgium

References

1983 establishments in Belgium
News magazines published in Belgium
Listings magazines
Magazines established in 1983
Television magazines
Quarterly magazines